Alex Rybakov (born January 27, 1997) is an American tennis player.
Rybakov has a career-high ATP singles ranking of 289 achieved on August 8, 2022. He also has a career-high ATP doubles ranking of 369 achieved on November 8, 2021.

He played college tennis at Texas Christian University.

Career
Rybakov made his ATP main draw debut at the 2023 Dallas Open after qualifying for the singles main draw.

References

External links
 
 
 

1997 births
Living people
American male tennis players
People from Plainview, New York
TCU Horned Frogs men's tennis players